is a  Japanese anime television series produced by studio Tengu Kobou. It premiered on October 5, 2016 on Tokyo MX.

Plot 
The story revolves around puzzle-solving.

Characters 

 The main protagonist of the story. Tokine was a regular 22-year-old woman, working as a secretary to the CEO of a company known as TEN2. After being swept into the world of Quizzun to solve riddles, Tokine possesses the power to discover the truth, and this aids her greatly in solving the riddles given to her. Her best friends are Yoshie and Kyouka.

 A little creature that resembles both a rabbit and a pig, showing Tokine the rules of Quizzun and granting her the special power of discovering truth. He is called a pig by Tokine and a rabbit by Natsuko.

 An employee at TEN2 and works at the front desk with Yoshie. She is best friends with Yoshie and Tokine and has a younger sister named Kyouko. Her family runs a hot spring on the edge of the country.

 An employee at TEN2 and works at the front desk with Kyouka. She is best friends with Tokine and Kyouka and often treats them to meals.

 An employee at TEN2 and a former cabaret member. She used her connections to get into the company and is looked down upon by Yoshie. Her real name is Tokuyo Nazo. Like Tokine, she is able to use her full capabilities in Quizzun, and the two possess similar powers and thinking strategies.

 Kyouka's younger sister and friends with Hinata and Mamori. She is currently in high school and works at the counter of the hot spring facility which is owned and run by her family.
Kaito Aen

Ansa Arishin

Media

Anime 
The anime is created and directed by Naoya Fukushi, with animation by Tengu Kobou. Hitomi Takano is designing the characters and Hiroyuki Moriyama is serving as chief photography director. Hiroaki Yabunaka is in charge of the sound effects and Hikaru Nakatsugawa is producing the series. Yūki Hasegawa and Ayumi Masui are collaborating on the writing of the scenario. Dream Vision's Takanori Morita is in charge of making the puzzles to solve. Yuzu Fujisaki will perform the opening theme song "Dimension Sky", and aki will perform the  ending theme song "destiny." Crunchyroll simulcasts the anime.

A second anime created and directed by Naoya Fukushi, with animation by Tengu Kobou premiered on July 12, 2017 on Tokyo MX.

Episode List

Notes

References

External links 
 

2016 anime television series debuts
2017 anime television series debuts
Tokyo MX original programming
Anime with original screenplays